Trinidad V. Canja - Sta. Teresa National High School (abbreviated as TVC - STNHS or Trinidad V. Canja - Sta. Teresa Nat'l High School) is a public high school located in Jordan, Guimaras.

History 

Sta. Teresa Barrio High School was opened in June, 1966 on the old site of Sta. Teresa Elementary School.
 
The high school's first principal was Pedro Alamigo. Faculty and staff included Dominador Gange, N. Hechanova, Clarita Gabasa, E. Gonzales and Elsie Ganancial. Initially, six teachers taught thirty-nine students, with one section for each level.

It was first named Sta. Teresa Barrio High School, then Sta. Teresa Barangay High School, for it accepted only enrollees from this barangay. The school became a Nationalized High School in 1989. It was later named Trinidad V. Canja – Sta. Teresa National High School.

Development 
At present, thousands of students study there from various barangays – San Miguel, Lawi, Buluangan, Sinapsapan, Espinosa, Ravina. Past graduates include teachers, seamen, nurses, doctors, engineers and lawyers.

See also 
 Iloilo National High School

External links 
 

High schools in the Philippines
Schools in Guimaras